was a district located in Tottori Prefecture, Japan.

As of 2003, the district had an estimated population of 22,283 and a density of 143.75 persons per km2. The total area was 155.01 km2.

Former towns and villages
 Aoya
 Ketaka
 Shikano

Merger
 On November 1, 2004 - the towns of Aoya, Ketaka and Shikano, along with the town of Kokufu, the village of Fukube (both from Iwami District), the towns of Kawahara and Mochigase and the village of Saji (all from Yazu District) were merged into the expanded city of Tottori. Ketaka District was dissolved as a result of this merger.

Former districts of Tottori Prefecture